White Dragon is the name of three fictional characters appearing in American comic books published by Marvel comics.

Publication history
The first version of White Dragon first appeared in Iron Man #39 and was created by Gerry Conway and Herb Trimpe.

The second version of White Dragon first appeared in The Amazing Spider-Man #184 and was created by Marv Wolfman and Ross Andru.

Fictional character biography

First White Dragon

The origin of the original White Dragon is unknown. At some point in his past, he served as a scientist in a Chinese organization called the Council of Nine. While the scientists of the Council of Nine are known to be brilliant, his special scientific abilities were brought to question by the Council of Nine. The scientist lost face and went into self-exile until he can prove himself. He was joined by his lover Shara-Lee (who was also the daughter of the man who had denounced him).

Becoming White Dragon, he had his agents plant gas bombs in the car of Tony Stark. Tony succumbed to the gas and drove off the bridge where he was saved from drowning by White Dragon's agents. Tony Stark was brought into White Dragon's submarine where he was placed in the Transcriber, a device that enabled White Dragon to reprogram his mind. Upon being released by White Dragon, Tony Stark began making new weapons and called a meeting at the United Nations to discuss his plans. White Dragon planned to have Tony Stark create new weapons that would fail and disgrace the United States. All the weapons that would be made would be junked leaving the United States defenseless and enable White Dragon to infiltrate and destroy the United States' Department of Defense. Not much later, Tony Stark became Iron Man which weakened the transmission that White Dragon placed in his mind. Iron Man learned that he was manipulated and began tracking the transmission. When White Dragon detected the lost contact with Tony Stark and the approaching of Iron Man, White Dragon sent his armored agents to fight Iron Man. The armored agents defeated Iron Man, but were defeated when the Avengers arrived. The armored agents fled while Iron Man leaves to figure out what is wrong with him. When his efforts with Tony Stark is a failure, White Dragon initiated the self-destruct of the device he placed in Tony Stark's head. The device did not harm Tony Stark since the Iron Man armor only enabled Iron Man to be knocked unconscious. Upon crashing to the ground, he was rescued by his ally Kevin O'Brien. Upon viewing the footage of Iron Man crashing to the ground, White Dragon correctly reasoned that Tony Stark was Iron Man.

White Dragon had his agents plant a nuclear weapon on the East River near the United Nations where it would destroy the council that was present at Tony Stark's meeting. Tony Stark knew that there was something awry with the weapons that were produced which he had no memory of creating and cancelled the meeting. White Dragon tried to take control of Tony Stark, but he got into his Iron Man armor and the Transcriber's power has been drained trying to get through the Iron Man armor. White Dragon sent his armored agents after Iron Man again. When White Dragon's armored agents knocked Iron Man into the river, Iron Man had an advantage where he manages to disable them and their undersea crafts. Iron Man then destroyed the blast tanks of White Dragon's submarine causing it to sink to the bottom of the river. White Dragon was stunned by Iron Man's attack on the submarine, but Shara-Lee was fully conscious when Iron Man boarded the submarine. Shara-Lee revealed that she was in control the whole time and that White Dragon was a pawn. After Iron Man left to see if the Stark Industries plant had exploded upon the bombs that were sent there, White Dragon recovered upon hearing Shara-Lee calling him a dupe and activated the self-destruct sequence which destroyed the submarine that he and Shara-Lee were in.

White Dragon II

The origin of the second White Dragon is unknown. He is the leader of the Dragon Lords in Chinatown where they tried to force Philip Chang (who had owned a restaurant in New York City with his aunt and uncle) to join them. Philip was rescued by Spider-Man who then defeated White Dragon and handed him over to the police.

A gang was started in Chinatown where White Dragon has killed the leader of the Tiger's Claw gang (which also wanted Philip Chang to join up with them). White Dragon then smoked Philip and his uncle out of his restaurant. In the nick of time, Spider-Man arrived with Moon Knight to help Philip. White Dragon then beat up Philip when he refuses to fight back and Spider-Man prevented the bombing of his restaurant. White Dragon was then defeated by Moon Knight who discovered that White Dragon was working with Kingpin to seize control over Chinatown.

In Hogan's Alley, Prowler worked with his brother Abe into fighting a gang of criminals that were attacking homeless people. Abe took a knife to the leg protecting Prowler and sent him after the last gang member. White Dragon stepped out of the shadows and attacked Abe. When White Dragon was about to use his fire breath on Abe, he is shot in the arm by a homeless man named Shark. White Dragon dropped his mask and ignited an incendiary device in it which caused a diversion enough for him to escape.

During the Dark Reign storyline, Mister Negative killed some of White Dragon's men in Sunset Park to gain control of Chinatown. Shortly after that, White Dragon joined up with Hood's crime syndicate where Hood sent him to supervise all operations there with his Dragon Lords including Mister Negative's business. White Dragon had a meeting with Mister Negative stating that Hood is going to take over his business and that Mister Negative was going to pay 65% of all his earnings to Hood. White Dragon was surprised that Mister Negative agreed to it, but then Mister Negative shook White Dragon's hand to corrupt him. Upon being sent back to Hood, the corrupted White Dragon attacked Hood's allies Bloodshed, Lightmaster. Spot, Squid, and White Rabbit while informing Hood that all Tong stood behind Mister Negative to keep Hood out of Chinatown. Hood then shot White Dragon several times and the seemingly-dead White Dragon returned to his uncorrupted state.

A character that resembles White Dragon's corrupted appearance was sent by Mister Negative to kidnap Boomerang from prison. The villain was defeated by Jackpot.

White Dragon shows up alive in London, where he becomes embroiled in a conflict with the local triad leader Skull-Crusher. He sends Razor Fist to kill Skill Crusher's lover and undercover MI-6 agent Leiko Wu, in Chinatown. When Leiko's ex-lover Shang-Chi arrives in London to investigate her murder, White Dragon sends his assassins to kill him, only to be repeatedly thwarted by the Master of Kung Fu. During his skirmishes with White Dragon, Shang-Chi, with the help of Skull-Crusher, the Daughters of the Dragon and the Sons of the Tiger discover that White Dragon has access to the Mao Shan Pai, a powerful Chinese black magic. When Shang-Chi and Skull-Crusher arrive at White Dragon's estate to fight him, they are captured by Shang-Chi's brother, Midnight Sun, who reveals himself to be the true mastermind behind White Dragon's actions. Midnight Sun plans to use the Mao Shan Pai to gain power and influence over the triad clans and since the ritual requires the heads of the clan leaders, White Dragon willingly offers his life to Midnight Sun, who then proceeds to decapitate him and Skull-Crusher.  However the ritual becomes botched as Skull-Crusher secretly made Leiko the leader of his clan, which resurrects Leiko from his blood. Leiko uses her newfound powers to summon the spirits of the dead triad leaders, including White Dragon, to drag Midnight Sun into their realm. White Dragon's men and Razor Fist are arrested by Black Jack Tarr and MI-6 when they storm White Dragon's estate to rescue Shang-Chi.

White Dragon III
A third White Dragon appeared where he led his henchmen into a gunfight with Owl's gang. White Dragon and Owl were brutally beaten up by the Superior Spider-Man (Doctor Octopus' mind in Peter Parker's body). The remainder of White Dragon's gang that evaded capture were recruited by Goblin King to join the Goblin Nation.

Powers and abilities
The first White Dragon was a talented inventor and scientist with a genius-level intellect.

The second White Dragon is an expert martial artist. He can also shoot gas or fire through the nostrils of his dragon mask. His costume also contains steel claws.

References

External links
 White Dragon I at Marvel Wiki
 White Dragon II at Marvel Wiki
 
 

Marvel Comics supervillains
Marvel Comics martial artists
Fictional inventors
Spider-Man characters
Triad (organized crime)